William G. Woodward (1808 – February 24, 1871) was a justice of the Iowa Supreme Court from January 9, 1855, to January 11, 1860, appointed from Muscatine County, Iowa.

References

Justices of the Iowa Supreme Court
Place of birth missing
Place of death missing
1808 births
1871 deaths
19th-century American judges